Alberta Bound may refer to:

 "Alberta Bound", a song from Gordon Lightfoot's 1972 album Don Quixote
 "Alberta Bound", a song from Paul Brandt's 2004 album This Time Around
 "Alberta Bound", a 2011 single by Bryan Adams